Phi Ta Khon (phǐi taa khǒn) is a festival held in Dan Sai, Loei province, Isan, Thailand. The events take place over three days sometime between March and July, the dates being selected annually by the town’s mediums.   

The whole event is called Bun Luang, part of a Buddhist merit-making holiday also known as Bun Phawet (assembly day). The town’s residents invite protection from Phra U-pakut, the spirit of the Mun river. They then hold a series of games and take part in a procession wearing masks made of the sheaths or bottom part of thick palm leaf stems. Bamboo sticky rice steaming baskets are stitched onto the tops of the sheaths to make the top section of the mask. Artists paint the masks with very creative and intricate designs and add carved wooden noses and ear-like appendages. The dancers wear loose and colorful patchwork pants and shirts, with strings of bells hanging down from their belts, in the back. They tease the spectators with big wooden phalluses.

The origins of this part of the festival are traditionally ascribed to a story of the Vessantara Jataka in which the Buddha in one of his past lives as a prince made a long journey and was presumed dead. The celebrations on his return were so raucous as to wake the dead.   

The second day of the festival incorporates elements of the Rocket Festival, plus costume and dance contests and more parades.

On the third and final day, the villagers listen to sermons from Buddhist monks.

See also

Transfer of merit
Rocket Festival

References

External links 

 The Phi Ta Khon Ghost Festival - Assumption University
 Phi Ta Khon - Thai Ways Magazine
Thai folklore
Buddhist festivals in Thailand
Isan culture
Buddhist holidays
March observances
April observances
May observances
June observances
July observances
Holidays and observances by scheduling (varies)